The Persian Cossack Brigade or Iranian Cossack Brigade was a Cossack-style cavalry unit formed in 1879 in Persia (modern Iran). It was modelled after the Caucasian Cossack regiments of the Imperial Russian Army. Until 1920, it was commanded by Russian officers, while its rank and file were composed of ethnic Caucasians and later on Persians as well. During much of the Brigade's history it was the most functional and effective military unit of the Qajar dynasty. Acting on occasion as kingmakers, this force played a pivotal role in modern Iranian history during the Revolution of 1905–1911, the rise of Reza Shah, and the foundation of the Pahlavi Dynasty.

Origin, purpose and makeup
The Cossack Brigade was formed by Nasir al-Din Shah in 1879, using as a model the Caucasian Cossack regiments of the Imperial Russian Army which had impressed him when travelling through southern Russia in 1878. Together with a Swedish-trained and officered gendarmerie, the Cossack Brigade came to comprise the most effective military force available to the Iranian crown in the years prior to World War I.

In spite of its name the Brigade was not a typical Cossack force as employed in the neighbouring Russian Empire. The Cossack regiments of the Imperial Russian Army were based on a feudal-style system under which military service was given in return for long-term grants of land. By contrast the Persian Cossack Brigade was recruited on a conventional basis, from a mix of volunteers and conscripts. Neither did it have the status of a guards unit. However, it closely resembled a true Cossack-style cavalry unit. Late 19th century photographs (see example below} show Russian style uniforms, in contrast to the indigenous dress of other Persian forces at the time. 

The rank and file of the Brigade were always Caucasian Muhajir and later Persian as well, but until 1920 its commanders were Russian officers who were also employed in the Russian army, such as Vladimir Liakhov. Such secondments were encouraged by the Imperial Russian Government who saw the Cossack Brigade as a means of extending Russian influence in a key area of international rivalry. After the October Revolution in 1917, many of these Russian officers left the country to join the "White" forces. The command of the Persian Cossack Division was subsequently transferred to Iranian officers. Most notable among these officers was General Reza Khan, who started his military career as a private soldier in the Cossack Brigade and rose through its ranks to become a brigadier general.

Detailed history

At the time of the Persian Cossack Brigade's formation the Shah’s royal cavalry was described as having no training or discipline. The Qajar state at this point was very weak, lacking any professional military forces. In wars against the British the royal cavalry had been defeated, and had even seen much difficulties against Turcoman nomads. The Tsar Alexander II approved Russian military advisors travelling to Persia to fulfill the Shah’s request. The brigade was then formed in 1879 by Lieutenant-Colonel Aleksey Domantovich, a Russian officer.

Early development of the Cossack Brigade
Russian interests and lack of funding slowed the initial development of the brigade into a professional fighting force. The initial strength of the brigade was 400 men drawn from immigrants known as Caucasian muhajirs, who were descendants of Circassians and Transcaucasian Muslims who had migrated to Iran to avoid Russian rule. They possessed special privileges as a hereditary military caste. Domantovich made rapid progress with their training and the Shah ordered the strength of the new brigade to be increased to 600 men drawn from the regular army. The rapid progress of the Cossack Brigade caused concern in Russia due to fear that it may become a true fighting force rather than a tool of the Russian government. Domantovich was dismissed as commander in 1881 and replaced by the less effective Colonel Charkovsij, over the protests of the Shah. Charkovsij added four artillery pieces to the arsenal of the Brigade in 1883 but made no other improvements. In 1886 Colonel Karavaev became commander. During his time, the Brigade faced with budget cuts and thus had its numbers diminished. In 1890 Colonel Shneur took over and was unable to pay the men. After many desertions, combined with a cholera epidemic, the strength was reduced to 450 men, and eventually cut down to 200. Shneur left in 1893 leaving command to a junior officer. By this time the brigade was rapidly disintegrating and the Shah was under pressure to disband it and give the Germans control over army training. It was further cut to just 150 men with one Russian officer. At this point it seemed that the Brigade would end as a failed experiment and be nothing more than a footnote in Persian history.

Turning point
The Persian Cossack Brigade was saved by the arrival of Colonel Kosagoskij who was to become the most effective commanding officer in its history. The immediate problem that he faced was the Muhajir aristocracy in the brigade, who considered themselves as an entitled elite. This privileged group often refused to work and reacted poorly to attempts at discipline. The Muhajir faction mutinied in 1895, dividing the brigade and seizing a large portion of its funds, encouraged by the Shah’s son who was Minister of War. Under pressure from Russia the Cossack Brigade was reunified under Kosagoskij’s command and the muhajirs were treated like other regular soldiers. The result was a great improvement in efficiency, resulting in a well-organized, well-trained, and obedient force.

Assassination of Nasir-ed-Din Shah 
The first major event involving the Brigade arose from the assassination of their founder, Nasir-ed-Din Shah on May 1, 1896. Chaos broke loose as different factions sought to take power, and mobs rampaged in the streets. The police were unable to control them and the regular army could not be relied upon to do so. Kosagovskij was given free rein by the Prime Minister Amin os-Soltan to “Act in accordance with your own understanding and wisdom.” Kosagovskij quickly mobilized the brigade and had them occupy the whole of Tehran in order to keep order in the city. The Brigade also became involved in intrigues between different factions of the Persian government. Nayeb os-Saltenah, the local commander of the forces in Tehran was likely to seize power from the legitimate heir, Mozaffar ad-Din Shah, who was in Tabriz. Kosagovski, backed by the Brigade, the Russians and British, warned Saltenah that only Mozaffar ad-Din Shah would be recognized as the legitimate heir. On June 7, 1896, Mozaffar ad-Din Shah entered Tehran escorted by the Cossacks. The Brigade on this date established themselves as kingmakers and in the future would serve as important tools for both the Russians and the Shah in maintaining control of Persia. Russian influence inside Persia expanded tremendously as the Brigade was able to exert massive control in internal Persian politics and intrigues.

As the brigade was numerically enlarging and drastically growing in military strength, eventually civilian volunteers were also accepted into its ranks, including members of ethnic and religious minorities. For example, from the mid-1890s until 1903, the highest-ranking Persian officer in the brigade was the chief of staff, Martiros Khan Davidkhanian, an Armenian from New Julfa, near Isfahan, who had been educated at the Lazarevskiĭ Institute, a secondary school for Armenians founded in Moscow by an Armenian merchant.

By 1903 the Brigade was reported to have grown to 1,500 men, with 200 Russian officers. This proportion of officers to other ranks was far higher than the one to thirty ratio that was usual in armies of that period and was regarded with concern by contemporary British commentators, who noted that the Brigade was effectively under the direct control of the Imperial Russian Legation in Tehran. The Brigade itself now included cavalry, infantry and artillery elements. It was independent of the regular Persian Army and under the command of a colonel of the Russian General Staff with the local rank of Field Marshal. The Persian rank and file were paid regularly on a monthly basis, at a cost amounting to 40,000 roubles.

Role during the Revolution of 1905-1911
The second major event the Cossack Brigade played a role in was the 1906 Constitutional Revolution, as a result of intense political pressure and rebellion. Mozaffar ad-Din Shah gave in to the rebels, and died shortly after signing the Constitution. It was the Persian Cossack Brigade that helped keeping his son Muhammad Ali Shah on the throne. As a consequence however, he was considered to be a Russian puppet. He later attempted to overthrow the government established by the Constitution using the Persian Cossack Brigade in January 1907. It surrounded the Majles (parliament) and shelled the building with heavy artillery. He was briefly successful and with the help of Colonel Liakhov, the Brigade commander, he governed Tehran for a year acting as a military dictator. Liakhov was appointed military governor of Tehran. In the ensuing civil strife forces from Azerbaijan led by Sattar Khan and Yeprem Khan retook Tehran from the Cossack Brigade, it forced the Shah to abdicate. Here the Brigade failed in ensuring the power of the Shah. Nonetheless the Brigade retained a great deal of importance as a tool for both the Russians and the Shah. Furthermore, Russian influence greatly expanded during this time period with Russian forces occupying several parts of Iran (mostly the north), and the country became divided into spheres of influence between the Russians and the British as agreed in the Anglo-Russian Agreement signed in August 1907.

Role in World War I
World War I spilled over into Persian territory as Ottoman, Russian, and British forces entered Persia. The Russian Command in 1916 expanded the Cossack Brigade to full divisional strength of roughly 8,000 men. The Brigade engaged in combat against Ottoman troops and helped to secure Russian interests in northern Persia. The British-created South Persia Rifles performed the same function in southern Iran for the British. 

Following the Russian Revolution of 1917, the British took over the Cossack Brigade and removed Russian officers, replacing them with British and Iranian ones. This was an important transition point in the history of the Brigade as it now came under complete British and Iranian control and was effectively purged of Russian influence.  Following the war Persia found itself devastated and divided as various regions of the country had broken away. In the 1920s, in order to re-exert central control, the Shah deployed the Cossack Brigade to crush the Azadistan movement in Tabriz. It was successful here but less effective in putting down another rebellion movement in the North, called the Jangali movement.

Role in the rise of Reza Shah

With Iran in chaos and facing fragmentation there was a political vacuum in Tehran, which had no functioning government. It is in this context of fragmentation and disorder that Reza Khan, an officer from the Cossack Brigade, rose to power as Iran’s “man on horseback” who would save the country from chaos. Reza Khan had joined the Brigade when he was sixteen years old and became the first Persian to be appointed as Brigadier-General of the Brigade. He had risen rapidly through the ranks of the Brigade following the British purge though he had learned much from the previous Russian officers. On 14 January 1921, the British General Ironside chose to promote Reza Khan, who had been leading the Tabriz battalion, to lead the entire brigade. After General Ironside promoted Reza Khan, members of the Brigade approached Alexander Khan Setkhanian, the Chief of Staff of the Brigade, to consider opposing Reza's rise. As Setkhanian had been fond of Reza when Reza had served under his command, Setkhanian chose not to oppose the takeover. About a month later, under British direction, Reza Khan led his 3,000-4,000 strong detachment of the Cossack Brigade based in Qazvin and Hamadan to Tehran in 1921 and seized the capital. With this coup Reza Khan established himself as the most powerful person in Iran. Although the coup was largely bloodless and faced little resistance, Setkhanian remained one of the last generals to pledge his loyalty to the new Shah. Seeking his assent, Reza visited Setkhanian at the Davidkhanian mansion on Sepah Street. While circumnavigating the pond, Setkhanian pledged his loyalty, and subsequently sat for a portrait in full regalia for the new regime.

Reza Khan's later modernization and enlargement of the army would utilise the Cossack Brigade as its core. Prior to World War I the Cossack Brigade constituted, together with the Swedish-trained gendarmerie, the only truly professional military forces in Iran. With his expanded forces and the Cossack Brigade, Reza Khan launched military actions to eliminate separatist and dissident movements in Tabriz, Mashhad, and the Jangalis in Gilan, Simko and the Kurds. The Brigade, with a strength of 7,000-8,000 men at the time, was merged with the gendarmerie and other forces to form the new Iranian Army of 40,000 which would be led by Iranian officers, many of them friends and cronies of Reza Khan from his days as an officer in the Cossack Brigade. These officers from the Cossack brigade received appointments and patronage in key positions in the new government and military. Using the Cossack Brigade as a springboard, Reza Khan found himself able to place himself in a position of power, centralizing the country, removing the Shah and crowning himself as new Shah, thus establishing the Pahlavi Dynasty. He was then called Reza Shah.

Legacy
The Cossack Brigade had helped establish the first centralized Iranian state since the time of the Safavids. While the history of the Cossack Brigade as a distinct entity ended with the rise of Reza Shah their influence on Iran has endured. The foundation of the centralized state established by Reza Shah persists to the present day.

Commanders

Notable senior officers
General Martiros Khan Davidkhanian
General Eskandar Khan Davidkhanian
General Alexander Khan Setkhanian
General Teymūr Khan Ayromlou
General Mohammad-Hosayn Ayrom
Amir Abdollah Tahmasebi
Sar Karim Buzarjomehri
Amanullah Jahanbani
Sepahbod Ahmad Amir-Ahmadi
Hassan Alavikia
Fazlollah Zahedi
Colonel Assadollah Hosseinpoor

Stations
Major
Tabriz, Rasht, Mashhad, Tehran, Esfahan, Qazvin

Minor
Hamedan, Bandar Anzali, Kermanshah

Military ranks and non-military titles
Commandant
Second-in-Command
Chief of Staff
Intendant
Atriyad Commander
General (regimental commander)
Major (battalion commander)
Captain (company commander)
Lieutenant
Second Lieutenant
Sergeant-major
Platoon Sergeant
Section Sergeant
Corporal
Drummer, Trumpeter, Cossack
Medical Officer, Accountant, Assistant Accountant, Clerk, Armourer

See also
 Cossacks
 Austro-Hungarian military mission in Persia
 Persian Gendarmerie
 Ethnic cleansing of Circassians

Footnotes

References
Keegan, John. World Armies. Macmillan Press, 1979. 

Atkin, Muriel Cossack Brigade Iranica
Cronin, Stephanie. The Army and the creation of the Pahlavi State in Iran, 1910-1926, Tauris Academic Studies, 1997. 
Abrahamian, Ervand. A History of Modern Iran. New York: Cambridge University Press, 2008. Print.
Hambly, Gavin R.G. . "The Pahlavi Autocracy: Riza Shah." The Cambridge History of Iran. New York: Cambridge University Press, 1991. 6. Print.
Kazemzadeh, F.. "The Origin and Early Development of the Persian Cossack Brigade." American Slavic and East European Review 15 (1956): 351-363.
Kazemzadeh, F.. "Iranian Relations with Russia and the Soviet Union, to 1921." The Cambridge History of Iran. New York: Cambridge University Press, 1991. 9. Print.
Savory, R. M. "Modern Persia." Cambridge Histories Online. Cambridge University Press. (1970) 595-626.

Military units and formations established in 1879
Cossack diaspora
Cossack military units and formations
Military units and formations of Iran
Military history of Russia
Military history of Qajar Iran
Iran–Russia relations
Military units and formations disestablished in 1921
1879 establishments in Iran
1921 disestablishments in Iran